Ghost in the Machine is the fourth studio album by English rock band the Police. The album was released on 2 October 1981 by A&M Records. The songs were recorded between January and September 1981 during sessions that took place at AIR Studios in Montserrat and Le Studio in Quebec, assisted by record producer Hugh Padgham.

Ghost in the Machine topped the UK Albums Chart and peaked at number two on the US Billboard 200. The album produced the highly successful singles "Every Little Thing She Does Is Magic", "Invisible Sun", and "Spirits in the Material World", with a fourth single, "Secret Journey", also being released in the US. Ghost in the Machine was listed at number 322 on Rolling Stones list of the 500 greatest albums of all time. The album was reissued in 1983 on CD.

Production and recording
After having produced the previous album Zenyatta Mondatta within a tight deadline of four weeks under pressure from the record company to deliver an album to the market, the band had decided to loosen up more for a change when it came around to recording Ghost in the Machine. This time they spent six weeks recording at AIR Studios in Montserrat, which was, according to drummer Stewart Copeland, "a 12 hour flight from the nearest record company".

This album marked a change in engineer/co-producer, from Nigel Gray—who did the band's first three albums up to that point—to Hugh Padgham, best known for the drum sound he achieved on records by Peter Gabriel and Phil Collins. In fact, for this album, Padgham initiated a technique in which the band were recording together in separate rooms of the AIR Studios facility: Andy Summers in the main studio with all his guitars and amplifiers, Sting in the control room with his bass directly plugged into the desk and Copeland in the dining room with his drums to get a "live" feel. This method would be repeated for the next album.

Ghost in the Machine was the first Police album to feature heavy use of keyboards and horns. All three members played synths to varying extents: Sting used an Oberheim OB-Xa (although he can also be seen with the Prophet-10 and Minimoog in photos from Andy Summers’ I’ll Be Watching You book) while Summers used a Prophet-5 to blend with the high guitar melody on "Spirits In The Material World" and Copeland played a Roland RS-505 Paraphonic synth on songs like "Darkness" and "Rehumanize Yourself". Besides keyboards, the twenty minute section comprising “Hungry for You (J'aurais toujours faim de toi)" through "One World (Not Three)" includes many saxophone harmonies, while the opening to "Secret Journey" showcases the Roland GR-300 Guitar Synthesizer.

The band's frontman Sting brought in Jean Roussel to record the piano parts on the demo of "Every Little Thing She Does Is Magic". However, the group could not better it with the equipment available at AIR Studios; they ended up using the demo as the backing track for the official recording, with drummer Stewart Copeland and guitarist Andy Summers dubbing their parts on. Sting also played all the saxophone parts on the album. Summers recollected:

The album opens with "Spirits in the Material World", featuring keyboards dubbed over Summers' reggae-inspired guitar licks. "Every Little Thing She Does Is Magic" features piano, a strong Caribbean vibe, and an extended non-verbal vocal solo at the end. "Invisible Sun" is a mixture of slow, steady verses, a bombastic chorus, and several guitar solos. "Hungry for You (J'aurais toujours faim de toi)" is sung mostly in French, with the bass and horns both repeating a single 8-note melody for the length of the song, while the guitar maintains a steady beat. "Demolition Man", the band's longest song—almost six minutes in length—features a strong bass line and saxophone, and was written by Sting while staying at Peter O'Toole's Irish mansion. The song was originally given to Jamaican singer Grace Jones, who released her rendition on Nightclubbing earlier in 1981; the Police then recorded a hard rock version for Ghost in the Machine due to their dissatisfaction with Jones' performance. A solo recording by Sting became a belated hit in 1993 as the theme song for the action film of the same title, starring Sylvester Stallone and Wesley Snipes. Manfred Mann's Earth Band also recorded a version—rearranged and with extensive use of synthesizers—in 1982 for their Somewhere in Afrika album.

"Too Much Information", "Rehumanize Yourself", and "One World (Not Three)" feature heavy use of horns. As with "Landlord" and "Dead End Job", Copeland had written both music and lyrics for "Rehumanize Yourself", but Sting rejected the lyrics and replaced them with ones he wrote himself. The final three songs, "Omegaman", "Secret Journey", and "Darkness", return to the darker sound which opens the album.

Artwork and titling
Much of the material on the album was inspired by Arthur Koestler's The Ghost in the Machine, which also provided the title. It was the first Police album to bear an English-language title. In his younger days Sting was an avid reader of Koestler. The subsequent Police album Synchronicity was inspired by Koestler's The Roots of Coincidence, which mentions Carl Jung's theory of synchronicity.

The cover art for Ghost in the Machine features a sixteen-segment display-inspired graphic that depicts the heads of the three band members, each with a distinctive hair style (from left to right, Andy Summers, Sting with spiky hair, and Stewart Copeland with a fringe); the band was unable to decide on a photograph to use for the cover. Wire bonds can be seen on the original issue vinyl album cover, suggesting perhaps that the display is a photographic collage. The graphic was designed by Mick Haggerty. The album's cover is ranked at number 45 on VH1's "50 Greatest Album Covers".

Commercial performance
Ghost in the Machine debuted at number one on the UK Albums Chart and spent three weeks atop the chart. In the United States, it reached number two on the Billboard 200.

"Omegaman" was chosen by A&M Records to be the first single from the album, but according to Andy Summers, Sting refused to allow its release in single form. "Invisible Sun" was ultimately released as the album's first single in the UK and was a great success, reaching number two on the UK Singles Chart, even though its music video was banned by the BBC for including footage of the conflict in Northern Ireland. "Every Little Thing She Does Is Magic" was released as the album's second overall single, and as the first single in most other territories, becoming the band's fourth UK number one and peaking at number three on the US Billboard Hot 100. "Spirits in the Material World" followed, peaking at number 12 in the UK and number 11 in the US. "Secret Journey" was released as a single in the US, where it charted at number 46.

Critical reception

The reception for Ghost in the Machine was mostly positive. Rolling Stones Debra Rae Cohen found that the Police "display more commitment, more real anger, on Ghost in the Machine than ever before." In Record Mirror, Robin Smith praised the album as "the best thing they've ever done", noting its "overall sense of dedication and quality" and more varied range of musical styles. Robert Christgau of The Village Voice remarked: "It's pointless to deny that they make the chops work for the common good—both their trickiness and their simplicity provide consistent pleasure here." Smash Hits critic Mark Ellen was less receptive, deeming it a "patchy" album with both "dazzling singles" and filler tracks reminiscent of the band's earlier material. Ghost in the Machine was voted the 24th best album of 1981 in The Village Voices Pazz & Jop critics' poll.

In a retrospective review of Ghost in the Machine, Greg Prato of AllMusic observed that the Police "had streamlined their sound to focus more on their pop side and less on their trademark reggae-rock." He found that the album was "not a pop masterpiece," but "did serve as an important stepping stone between their more direct early work and their more ambitious latter direction." J. D. Considine, writing in 2004's The New Rolling Stone Album Guide, stated that "well-modulated" compositions such as "Spirits in the Material World" and "Every Little Thing She Does Is Magic" reflected the band's continued experimentation with more dynamic rhythms.

In 2000, Q placed Ghost in the Machine at number 76 on its list of the "100 Greatest British Albums Ever". Pitchfork ranked Ghost in the Machine at number 86 on its 2002 list of the 100 best albums of the 1980s. It was ranked at number 322 on Rolling Stones 2003 list of the 500 greatest albums of all time, and at number 323 in a 2012 update of the list. The Guardian featured the record in its 2007 list of "1000 Albums to Hear Before You Die".

Writing in 2021 for a Best Albums of 1981 list, Paste contributor Saby Reyes-Kulkarni observed that "There are albums that envelope you in an ambience so unlike anything else you’ve ever heard that listening to them is like taking a trip to another world," further describing Ghost in the Machine as "the most sonically unified work of [The Police's] career, a seamless and revolutionary integration of reggae into [the band's style] that, like Talking Heads and Peter Gabriel, established a futurist vision of pop that could absorb sounds from all over the world—in some ways, pop music has operated from the same premise ever since."

Track listing

Personnel
Credits are adapted from the album's liner notes.

The Police
 Sting – bass guitar, lead and backing vocals, double bass, keyboards, saxophone
 Andy Summers – guitar, backing vocals, keyboards
 Stewart Copeland – drums, percussion, backing vocals (5, 11), keyboards (7, 11)

Additional musicians
 Jean Roussel – keyboards (2)
 Danny Quatrochi - bass (5), additional bass (uncredited) 
Production
 Hugh Padgham – production, engineering
 The Police – production
 Ted Jensen – mastering
 Jeff Ayeroff – art direction
 Mick Haggerty – art direction, artwork, design

Charts

Weekly charts

Year-end charts

Certifications and sales

Notes

1981 albums
A&M Records albums
Albums produced by Hugh Padgham
The Police albums
Albums recorded at Le Studio
Albums recorded at AIR Studios